Two polls made up the 2018–19 NCAA Division I women's ice hockey rankings, the USCHO.com poll and the USA Today/USA Hockey Magazine poll. As the 2018–19 season progresses, rankings were updated weekly.

Legend

USCHO

USA Today

References 

2018–19 NCAA Division I women's hockey season
College women's ice hockey rankings in the United States